Florence Yu Pan (born November 16, 1966) is an American attorney who serves as a United States circuit judge of the United States Court of Appeals for the District of Columbia Circuit. She is a former associate judge of the Superior Court of the District of Columbia and former United States district judge of the United States District Court for the District of Columbia.

Early life and education 
Pan was born in 1966 in New York City and raised in Tenafly, New Jersey. Pan's parents had immigrated to the United States from Taiwan in 1961.

Pan graduated from the University of Pennsylvania in 1988 with a double Bachelor of Arts and Bachelor of Science degree summa cum laude from the Wharton School. From 1988 to 1990, she was a financial analyst at the American investment bank Goldman Sachs. She then attended Stanford Law School, where she was an editor of the Stanford Law Review, an editor of the Stanford Law and Policy Review, and a finalist in the school's moot court competition. She graduated with distinction in 1993 with a Juris Doctor.

Legal career 
After graduating from law school, Pan served as a law clerk for Judge Michael Mukasey of the U.S. District Court for the Southern District of New York from 1993 to 1994 and for Judge Ralph K. Winter Jr. of the U.S. Court of Appeals for the Second Circuit from 1994 to 1995.

Pan worked for the United States Department of Justice as a Bristow Fellow in the Office of the Solicitor General from 1995 to 1996 and then as an attorney in the Appellate Section of the Criminal Division from 1996 to 1998. She next worked at the United States Department of Treasury, first as a senior advisor to the Assistant Secretary for Financial Markets in 1998 and subsequently as a senior advisor to the Undersecretary for Domestic Finance in 1999.

From 1999 to 2009, she served as an assistant United States attorney in the United States Attorney's Office for the District of Columbia, where she also served as Deputy Chief of the Appellate Section from 2007 to 2009.

Judicial service

Superior Court of the District of Columbia service 
On March 24, 2009, President Barack Obama nominated Pan to serve as an associate judge on the Superior Court of the District of Columbia. Pan was confirmed by voice vote on May 21, 2009. She remained on the court until her confirmation to the U.S. District Court for the District of Columbia in 2021.

Expired nomination to U.S. district court under Obama 
On April 28, 2016, President Barack Obama nominated Pan to serve as a United States district judge of the United States District Court for the District of Columbia, to the seat vacated by Judge Reggie Walton, who assumed senior status on December 31, 2015. On July 13, 2016, a hearing on her nomination was held before the United States Senate Committee on the Judiciary. On September 15, 2016, her nomination was reported out of committee by a voice vote. Her nomination expired on January 3, 2017, with the end of the 114th Congress.

Re-nomination to U.S district court under Biden 

On March 30, 2021, President Joe Biden announced his intent to nominate Pan to serve as a United States district judge for the United States District Court for the District of Columbia. On June 15, 2021, her nomination was sent to the Senate. President Biden nominated Pan to the seat vacated by Judge Ketanji Brown Jackson, who was nominated to serve as a Circuit Judge for the United States Court of Appeals for the District of Columbia Circuit. On July 14, 2021, a hearing on her nomination was held before the Senate Judiciary Committee. On August 5, 2021, her nomination was reported out of committee by a 18–4 vote. On September 22, 2021, the United States Senate invoked cloture on her nomination by a 66–27 vote. On September 23, 2021, her nomination was confirmed by a 68–30 vote. She received her judicial commission the same day. She is the first Asian American woman to serve on the U.S. District Court for the District of Columbia. Her service as a district judge was terminated on September 28, 2022, when she was elevated to the United States Court of Appeals for the District of Columbia Circuit.

Court of appeals service 

On May 25, 2022, President Joe Biden nominated Pan to a seat on the United States Court of Appeals for the D.C. Circuit. She was nominated to the seat being vacated by Judge Ketanji Brown Jackson, who was elevated to the Supreme Court of the United States. A hearing on her nomination was held before the Senate Judiciary Committee on June 22, 2022. On July 21, 2022, her nomination was reported out of committee by a 13–9 vote. On September 19, 2022, the United States Senate invoked cloture on her nomination by a 52–38 vote. On September 20, 2022, her nomination was confirmed by a 52–42 vote. She received her judicial commission on September 26, 2022. She is the first Taiwanese American to serve on the United States Court of Appeals for the D.C. Circuit.

Personal life 
In 2004, Pan married attorney Max Stier, whom she met at Stanford Law School and who serves as the president and CEO of the Partnership for Public Service, at the Embassy of New Zealand in Washington, D.C. They have two sons.

See also
List of Asian American jurists

References

External links 

|-

|-

1966 births
Living people
21st-century American judges
21st-century American women lawyers
21st-century American lawyers
21st-century American women judges
American jurists of Taiwanese descent
Assistant United States Attorneys
Judges of the Superior Court of the District of Columbia
Judges of the United States Court of Appeals for the D.C. Circuit
Judges of the United States District Court for the District of Columbia
Lawyers from New York City
Stanford Law School alumni
United States court of appeals judges appointed by Joe Biden
United States district court judges appointed by Joe Biden
University of Pennsylvania alumni